Down the Road is the debut solo studio album by American country music artist Larry Stewart. It was his first solo release, as he had left his role as lead singer of the band Restless Heart a year before. The album was released in 1993 on RCA Records Nashville and it produced three singles for him on the Billboard country charts: "Alright Already" at number five, "I'll Cry Tomorrow" at number 34 and "We Can Love" at number 62. Also included is "When I Close My Eyes", a number two hit in 1997 for Kenny Chesney.

Brian Mansfield of Allmusic rated the album four stars out of five, saying that he considered it more country than Stewart's work in Restless Heart.

Track listing

AOmitted from cassette version.

Personnel
Compiled from liner notes.

Musicians

 Eddie Bayers — drums
 Suzy Bogguss — background vocals
 Larry Byrom — electric guitar
 Bruce C. Bouton — steel guitar
 Mark Casstevens — acoustic guitar
 Carol Chase — background vocals
 Chad Cromwell — drums
 Bill Cuomo — synthesizer
 Dan Dugmore — acoustic guitar, steel guitar
 Stuart Duncan — fiddle
 Rick Giles — background vocals
 Vince Gill — background vocals
 Doyle Grisham — steel guitar
 Rob Hajacos — fiddle
 John Jorgenson — electric guitar
 Chris Leuzinger — electric guitar
 Brent Mason — electric guitar
 Terry McMillan — percussion
 Steve Nathan — piano, synthesizer, Hammond B-3 organ
 Michael Noble — acoustic guitar
 Danny Parks — electric guitar
 Dave Pomeroy — bass guitar
 Michael Rhodes — bass guitar
 Brent Rowan — electric guitar
 John Wesley Ryles — background vocals
 Larry Stewart — lead vocals, piano
 Harry Stinson — background vocals
 Cindy Richardson Walker — background vocals
 Biff Watson — acoustic guitar
 John D. Willis — electric guitar
 Dennis Wilson — background vocals

Technical
 Mike Clute — additional recording
 Scott Hendricks — producer, mixing
 John Kelton — recording
 John Kunz — additional recording
 Larry Stewart — producer
 Hank Williams — mastering

References

1993 debut albums
Albums produced by Scott Hendricks
Larry Stewart (singer) albums
RCA Records albums